"Around the World (La La La La La)" is the debut single of German-based international Eurodance group ATC (an abbreviation of A Touch of Class). The song is a cover of the Russian hit "Pesenka" by Ruki Vverh! and uses the song's melody with additional English lyrics. Both songs feature the phrase "la la la la la" in a call and response format. Released in May 2000, the song is ATC's most successful single, reaching the top 20 in most countries where it was released.

Background and release
"Around the World (La La La La La)" was released as ATC's debut single from their debut album, Planet Pop, on 22 May 2000 in Germany. It was produced and recorded by German producer Alex Christensen with its melody almost entirely based on "Pesenka". The single reached number one on the German Singles Chart for six weeks in 2000. It also reached number one in Austria, Poland, Romania, and Switzerland and the top 10 in Belgium, Canada, Denmark, Finland, Hungary, the Netherlands, and Sweden.

On 6 November 2000, the song was released in the United Kingdom but did not chart. In August 2002, it was re-released in a newly remixed version, peaking at number 15 on the UK Singles Chart. In the United States, "Around the World (La La La La La)" was serviced to radio stations on 16 January 2001 and peaked at number 28 on the Billboard Hot 100 chart; however, because of scant promotion for the album and a lack of touring in the US and Canada, follow-up singles failed to make any impact in North America.

Music video
The music video for "Around the World" was filmed in 1999, and part of it was filmed in a pedestrian tunnel near Internationales Congress Centrum Berlin in Berlin.

A yellow Melkus RS 1000 with a blue license plate containing the text "ATC" features in the video. It appears both as a miniature slot car and as original. It is seen drifting and dashing through the tunnel. In one scene, two girls are sitting on the hood while it is driving. In between shots of the car moving, you can see the group members dancing in a room with a small swimming pool. They dance on a small stage, and never enter the water.

Track listings

 European CD single 1
 "Around the World (La La La La La)" (radio version) – 3:35
 "Around the World (La La La La La)" (acoustic mix) – 3:20

 European CD single 2
 "Around the World (La La La La La)" (radio version) – 3:35
 "Around the World (La La La La La)" (club mix) – 5:37

 European maxi-CD and Australian CD single
 "Around the World (La La La La La)" (radio version) – 3:35
 "Around the World (La La La La La)" (alternative radio version) – 3:31
 "Around the World (La La La La La)" (acoustic mix) – 3:20
 "Around the World (La La La La La)" (Rüegsegger#Wittwer club mix) – 5:37
 "World in Motion" – 3:31

 European maxi-CD single (Remixes)
 "Around the World (La La La La La)" (Rüegsegger#Wittwer club mix—short) – 3:44
 "Around the World (La La La La La)" (RNT mix) – 3:08
 "Around the World (La La La La La)" (extended club mix) – 4:58
 "Around the World (La La La La La)" (Triage club mix) – 5:10

 US 12-inch single
A1. "Around the World (La La La La La)" (album version) – 3:35
A2. "Around the World (La La La La La)" (Rüegsegger#Wittwer club mix) – 5:37
A3. "Around the World (La La La La La)" (RNT mix) – 3:08
B1. "Around the World (La La La La La)" (extended club mix) – 4:58
B2. "Around the World (La La La La La)" (Triage club mix) – 5:10
B3. "Around the World (La La La La La)" (acoustic mix) – 3:20

 UK CD single (2002)
 "Around the World (La La La La La)" (2002 single mix) – 3:37
 "Around the World (La La La La La)" (acoustic mix) – 3:21
 "Around the World (La La La La La)" (Almighty mix) – 7:13
 "Around the World (La La La La La)" (2002 extended mix) – 4:41
 "Around the World (La La La La La)" (video)

 UK cassette single (2002)
 "Around the World (La La La La La)" (2002 single mix) – 3:37
 "Around the World (La La La La La)" (acoustic mix) – 3:21
 "Around the World (La La La La La)" (Almighty mix) – 7:13
 "Around the World (La La La La La)" (2002 extended mix) – 4:41

Charts

Weekly charts

Year-end charts

Decade-end charts

Certifications

Release history

R3hab version

In 2019, Dutch DJ R3hab released a cover version titled "All Around the World (La La La)", with the band being credited as A Touch of Class.

Weekly charts

Year-end charts

Certifications

Samples
In 2020, Ava Max sampled "Around the World" for her single "My Head & My Heart", in which the members of A Touch of Class praised her for sampling of their song. 
In 2021, Pitbull sampled "Around the World" with IAMCHINO for their single "Discoteca". They performed the song with DJ Deorro at the 2022 Premio Lo Nuestro awards.

In popular culture

In 2007, the song was released with new lyrics as "Magic Melody" by German pop group beFour. "Sing La La La", an interpolation of the song, was released by Colombian/Italian singer Carolina Márquez featuring Flo Rida and Dale Saunders in 2013. A cover version of the song was used in a television commercial for General Electric in the United States in February 2002 during the 2002 Winter Olympics. In 2018, Alex Christensen, along with Melanie C and the Berlin Orchestra, made an orchestral version of the song which was included on Christensen's album titled Classical '90s Dance 2. American singer Ava Max interpolates the song in her 2020 single "My Head & My Heart". Pitbull sampled the song with IAMCHINO for their late-2021 single "Discoteca". They performed the song with DJ Deorro at the 2022 Premio Lo Nuestro awards.

See also
 "Pesenka"
 List of Romanian Top 100 number ones of the 2000s

Notes

References

External links
 "ATC - Around The World (HQ)" at YouTube

2000 songs
2000 debut singles
2019 singles
A Touch of Class (band) songs
R3hab songs
Casablanca Records singles
Liberty Records singles
Number-one singles in Austria
Number-one singles in Germany
Number-one singles in Poland
Number-one singles in Romania
Number-one singles in Switzerland
RCA Records singles
Song recordings produced by Alex Christensen
Songs written by Alex Christensen
Universal Records singles